Anya Williams (born 8 October 1980) is a Turks and Caicos Islander politician who is currently serving as Deputy Governor of the Turks and Caicos Islands since 15 October 2012.

Williams has a Master of Science in accounting from Florida International University. She has worked as Permanent Secretary in the government's finance office.

Williams was born on Grand Turk Island. Secretary of State for Foreign and Commonwealth Affairs William Hague appointed Williams to her position, effective 15 October 2012.

References

1980 births
Deputy Governors of the Turks and Caicos Islands
Florida International University alumni
Government accounting officials
Living people
Turks and Caicos Islands women in politics
Women accountants